Shirley Armitage is a fictional character from the British ITV soap opera Coronation Street. Played by Lisa Lewis, the character appeared for a period of six years between 1983 and 1989.  Shirley became the programme's first regular black character.

Shirley Armitage was a machinist at Baldwin's Casuals. From 1988 to 1989, she lived with Curly Watts in the shop flat but left the area when they split up.

Storylines
Shirley Armitage started work at denim factory Baldwin's Casuals in September 1983. Shirley came from a big family, with nine living in the same house. At the factory, Shirley was one of the youngest machinists and usually stayed quiet while the louder personalities, chiefly Vera Duckworth (Liz Dawn) and Ida Clough (Helene Palmer), led the gossip. She occasionally spoke up to back the girls against Mike Baldwin (Johnny Briggs), for example when she favoured a strike when Mike announced that some of the staffs' jobs would be at risk because of a new computer system at the factory in July 1984.

In 1985, Shirley chatted to Curly Watts (Kevin Kennedy) at a dance at the Community Centre and let him walk her home afterwards. Curly was shy about asking her out but they hit it off and Curly later chatted her up at Kevin (Michael Le Vell) and Sally Webster's (Sally Dynevor) flatwarming party in August 1987. They started seeing each other on a casual basis after that. By 1986, Shirley was getting sick of living in such a crowded home and decided to ask Alf Roberts (Bryan Mosley) if she could rent the shop flat as the Websters had moved into No.13. Alf asked for a reference but in the time it took her to get one from Emily Bishop (Eileen Derbyshire), Curly also made enquiries about the flat and Alf agreed he could move in. When Shirley and Curly compared notes, they were puzzled as Curly hadn't been asked for a reference. Thinking Alf racist, Curly decided to refuse the flat but Shirley suggested they move in together. Curly agreed and Alf backed down when Emily threatened to tell people about his racism. The unexpected move marked a big change in Shirley's and Curly's lives, as well as their relationship, with Shirley becoming the first woman Curly had ever slept with. Their next obstacle was winning over each other's families, no easy task as despite the race issue, Shirley's parents disapproved of her living in sin. Eventually, Mrs Armitage was convinced that Curly loved Shirley but his parents never accepted Shirley. Mrs Armitage was accepting enough to let Shirley's younger sister, Lucy, stay with the couple for a few weeks in August.

Later that year, Curly enrolled in a business studies course at college. Shirley wasn't convinced it would be a good move as that would make Shirley the sole earner while he studied but she admired his ability and caused a stir at work by showing them Curly's essay on Mike making the machinists work in terrible Victorian conditions. Mike insisted Curly give it to him, threatening to sack Shirley otherwise. Curly's new career was to split the couple up. In April 1989, Shirley threw a surprise party to celebrate their first anniversary but Curly promptly threw everyone out as he had an important exam the next day. Shirley realised that Curly was too serious for her and decided to move back in with her parents. Desperate to stop Shirley leaving, Curly broke down and proposed marriage, promising to change, but Shirley knew that the relationship had run its course and left.

Shirley left Baldwin's Casuals, a week after splitting up with Curly and moved to Gorton.

References 

Coronation Street characters
Fictional Black British people
Fictional machinists
Television characters introduced in 1983
Fictional factory workers
Female characters in television